Morocco Omari (born May 7, 1975) is an American film, television, and theater actor, screenwriter, producer, and a director. He was born in Chicago, Illinois. He is best known for his role as Tariq in the Hip-Hop television drama series Empire, Chicago Fire on NBC, Prison Break, Homeland on Showtime, Malcolm & Eddie, Early Edition, NCIS on CBS; The Beast,  and 24.

He co-stars in Empire with Terrence Howard and Taraji Henson.

Morocco's film credits also include 21 Bridges Gun Hill, Half Past Dead 2, Kubuku Rides, and Momentum.

His theater credits include Pipeline, Intimate Apparel, Knock Me a Kiss, and Blues for an Alabama Sky.

Morocco directed Good Intentions, (Mis) Leading Man, and Mission Mom: Possible. He wrote and produced the short film The Male Groupie.

Early life
Morocco grew up on the West Side, Chicago. He says of his early life: "Looking back, I had to be a storyteller; we didn't have a whole lot of outlets on the West Side. But it wasn't until after I was shot at - that I sat down and thought about what I really wanted to do".

Career
Morocco's acting career starting in 1998 after being in the U.S. Marines, and returning from Desert Storm. He appeared in TV series such as Malcolm & Eddie and Early Edition. He had recurring roles in Joan of Arcadia with Patrick Fabian, the television show Dragnet with Chuti Tiu and François Chau, Crossing Jordan and NCIS with Pauley Perrette. He also appeared in Girlfriends, Season 1 Episode 2, as the man interested in Toni at Davis’ restaurant.

In films, he has appeared in Constellation and Half Past Dead 2.

As a voice over artist Morocco has worked on campaigns such as Powerade, McDonald's, Budweiser, Sony, The Bible Experience, and Toyota.

Filmography

Film

Television

Video Game

Awards
American Black Film Festival Award for Best Short Film, The Male Groupie.
2009 - Best Short Film from Hollywood Black Film Festival for 'The (Mis)Leading Man'', produced by casting director Sharon King, MJ Allen and Kia J. Goodwin

References

External links
Meet the cast video series: Morocco Omari
TheGrioLive: Morocco Omari from Empire
Empire' Morocco Omari talks Roots, Acting and Love on his trip to Rwanda
Morocco Omari talks about Africa

Living people
1975 births
20th-century American male actors
21st-century American male actors
African-American film directors
African-American male actors
American film directors
American male film actors
American male television actors
American male video game actors
Male actors from Chicago
20th-century African-American people
21st-century African-American people